Vachellia cernua is a species of legume in the family Fabaceae. It is found only in Somalia, and is threatened by habitat loss.

References

cernua
Flora of Somalia
Near threatened plants
Endemic flora of Somalia
Taxonomy articles created by Polbot